Comedy Central is a German free-to-air channel owned by Paramount Networks EMEAA. It is distributed in Germany, Austria, and Switzerland and broadcasts many American and British imported television series as well as original programming. It launched on 15 January 2007 replacing former music channel VIVA Plus. Prior to its launch, Viacom had Nick Comedy, which was a timeshared channel with Nickelodeon Germany, airing from 9:15pm to 6:00am (similar to Adult Swim channel with Cartoon Network nighttime schedule).

From 15 December 2008 – 31 December 2018 Comedy Central Germany ceased broadcasting 24 hours a day and started timesharing its slot with Nickelodeon Germany first then later VIVA Germany, running from 8:15pm to 5:45am. However, after VIVA ceased on 31 December 2018 at 14:00 Comedy Central returned to broadcast 24 hours a day.

On 1 October 2011, Comedy Central Germany was rebranded, using the American new logo and graphic packages.

History 
Comedy Central Germany was licensed by the Media Authority of North Rhine-Westphalia (LfM), which is also the supervising State media authority for the channel. On 24 November 2006, the license of VIVA Plus was changed to Comedy Central. Due to this, it got a license valid until 20 March 2010.
Viacom initially tried to establish the channel independently as a 24-hour network. On 15 December 2008, however, Comedy Central started to timeshare its frequency with Nickelodeon and therefore reduced its broadcast time to 9:30 hours, from 8:15pm until 5:45am. Viacom previously launched a comedy timeshared channel using that same timeslot named Nick Comedy, which lasted from 2005 to 2006. It was shut down in favour of Comedy Central Germany.

On 1 March 2010, Comedy Central Germany switched its aspect ratio to 16:9 and began airing its programming schedule in widescreen.

From 1 October 2014, Comedy Central Germany shared air-time with VIVA Germany, due to launch of NickNight, late night block equivalent to American Nick@Nite until 31 December 2018 when VIVA ceased with Comedy Central finally broadcasting 24/7.

On 1 March 2021, MTV+ was replaced by Comedy Central +1.

Austrian subfeed 
An Austrian subfeed of the channel was launched on 1 January 2011. The programming is the same as the German main feed with the exception of airing local advertisements. It replaced VIVA Austria's timeslot on Nickelodeon Austria as a timeshared channel, following the shut down of MTV Austria. Due to VIVA closing, Comedy Central became a 24-hour channel.

Swiss subfeed 
In Switzerland, a localised subfeed was launched on 16 May 2011. The Swiss subfeed differs from the main feed on having less on-air time, ending its broadcast at 5:00am in favour of Nickelodeon Switzerland. Like in Austria, Comedy Central replaced VIVA Switzerland, which had its programming moved to MTV Switzerland in the following months. Nevertheless, Viacom announced on 28 September 2012 that VIVA Switzerland would be launched again on 1 October as a full, 24-hour channel. Due to VIVA closing, Comedy Central became a 24-hour channel.

High-definition feed 

On 16 May 2011, Viacom launched Comedy Central HD, which was picked up by Telekom and Vodafone TV. Later, on 11 June 2011, HD+ by Astra starts offering the channel on its satellite line up.

References

External links 
 ComedyCentral Germany and Austria
 ComedyCentral Switzerland

2007 establishments in Germany
Comedy Central
Television channels and stations established in 2007
Television stations in Berlin